Louis-Zéphirin-Rousseau Ecological Reserve is an ecological reserve in Quebec, Canada. It was established on May 4, 1988.

References

External links
 Official website from Government of Québec

Protected areas of Laurentides
Nature reserves in Quebec
Protected areas established in 1988
1988 establishments in Quebec